Admiral Mohammad Shariff  (1 July 1920 – 27 April 2020), was a Pakistan Navy senior admiral, who served as the 2nd Chairman of Joint Chiefs of Staff Committee and a memoirist who was at the center of all the major decisions made in Pakistan in the events involving the war with India in 1971, the enforcement of martial law in the country in 1977, and the decision in covertly intervening against Soviet Union in Afghanistan.

Gaining commission in the Royal Indian Navy, he participated in World War II on behalf of Great Britain before joining the Pakistan Navy in 1947 as one of the senior staff officers. In 1969, he was appointed the Flag Officer Commanding of the Eastern Naval Command in East Pakistan during the civil war there, followed by the foreign intervention by India in 1971. After the war, he was taken as a war prisoner along with Lieutenant-General A.A.K Niazi, the commander of Pakistan Army's Eastern Command after conceding the surrender of the Pakistan Armed Forces personnel to the Indian Army.

He resumed his active military service in the Navy after his repatriation from India and was appointed the Chief of Naval Staff in 1975 after the sudden death of Vice-Admiral Hasan Ahmed. He had the distinction of being the first four-star admiral in the navy and was the first admiral to be appointed as Chairman joint chiefs committee in 1978 until 1980. As the Chairman Joint Chiefs Committee, he continued to advocate for an aggressive foreign policy and a strong nuclear deterrent against foreign intervention.

After retiring from the military in 1980, Shariff was appointed as chairman of Federal Public Service Commission while he continued his role as military adviser to President Zia-ul-Haq until 1988 when he retired from public service. After living a quiet life in Islamabad, he announced the publishing of his memoirs, Admiral's Diary, providing further accounts, causes, and failure of the military crackdown in East Pakistan.

Biography

World War II and RIN career

Mohammad Shariff was born in Gujrat, Punjab, British India, into an Kashmiri-Punjabi family in 1920. As many of his contemporaries, he was educated at the Rashtriya Indian Military College and joined the Royal Indian Navy (RIN) in 1936 as a sailor in the Communications Branch. One of his close colleagues at this time was Gautum Singh, whom he would fight against in 1971.

He participated in the World War II as a signalist in the Royal Indian Navy on behalf of Great Britain and took part in military action in the Atlantic, Mediterranean, Red sea, and Bay of Bengal. In 1945, he went to the United Kingdom to attend the Britannia Royal Naval College in Dartmouth, England where he graduated with a staff course degree.

War and staff appointments in Pakistan Navy

In 1947, the United Kingdom announced the partition of India. After the creation of Pakistan on 14 August 1947, Lieutenant Shariff decided to opt for Pakistan and joined the newly established Pakistan Navy.

He was the 20th most senior Lieutenant in the navy in terms of seniority list provided by the Royal Indian Navy to the Ministry of Defense (MoD) in 1947.> In the 1950s, he served on various assignments in the Pakistan military and served as a senior staff officer at the Navy NHQ from 1953 to 1956 as Lieutenant-Commander. In 1960, he was promoted as Commander in the Navy and went to the United States where he attended the Naval War College in Newport, Rhode Island, and graduated with a master's degree in War studies in 1962.

Upon returning to Pakistan in 1962, he was appointed as Deputy Chief of Naval Staff (Personnel) with a promoting rank of Captain at the NHQ.

In 1965, Captain Shariff continued his staff appointment role as DCNS (Personnel) at the NHQ and participated in the second war with India in 1965. He participated in planning of the naval assault against the Indian Navy and provided his analysis based on personnel preparation for the operation.

In 1966, he was promoted as Commodore and posted as DCNS (Operations) by the Commander in Chief Admiral Syed Mohammad Ahsan where he continued his role until 1969. In 1968, Commodore Shariff paid a goodwill visit to China alongside and held defence talks with the senior leadership of People's Liberation Army.

Pakistan Eastern Naval Command

In 1969, Commodore Shariff was promoted as Rear-Admiral, a two-star rank, and posted in East Pakistan as Flag Officer Commanding (FOC) at the Eastern Naval Command HQ. His naval command was coordinated with the army's Eastern Command.

During the same time, President General Yahya Khan appointed Admiral Syed Mohammad Ahsan as the Governor of East Pakistan and Lt. Gen. Yaqub Khan as the commander of the army's Eastern Command, and the activities, momentum, and magnitude of the Pakistan Navy in East Pakistan increased at a maximum level, and more military and naval exercises began to take place in East Pakistan that initially focused on gathering intelligence on Indian infiltration in East. East Pakistan, under the martial law administration of Admiral Ahsan, saw the period of stability and the civil control and law and order situation was effectively under control. In 2010, Admiral Shariff authored his memories and concluded:

In 1970, the Election Commission held the general elections in the country that resulted in Awami League securing the supermajority in the East while Pakistan Peoples Party claiming the mandate in Pakistan. When the agitations in East Pakistan began to gain momentum, President Yahya held meeting with Governor Vice-Admiral Syed Mohammad Ahsan and army's Eastern Command's commander Lieutenant-General Yaqub Ali Khan over their mission outcomes where both objected the brute force against the Bengali rebels. Despite opposition, President Yahya Khan authorized the Operation Searchlight and accepted the resignations from Governor Admiral Ahsan and General Yaqub, only to be appointed Lieutenant-General Tikka Khan as their capacity.

The Searchlight resulted in quick success, but it had created a temporary momentum on Bengali rebels who started their insurgency from Barisal, a riverine city which the Army had failed to infiltrated. Therefore, Rear-Admiral Shariff's command was put in test when he authorized the launch of Barisal which resulted in immediate success, but it had no long-lasting effects.

As the war progressed, he insisted on deployment of the combat warships to mount a serious pressure on the Indian Navy's Eastern Naval Command but the Navy NHQ did not grant his wishes in fear of losing the warships into the hands of the enemy. He personally led many operations undertaken after the deployment of the Marines and SSG(N) against the Eastern Command of the Indian Army despite logistical disadvantages. Overall, the Pakistan Navy performed its mission task well and diligently by providing support to the army until the end. However, while the Navy was successful by performing its task, Pakistan Army's Eastern Military Commands were unsuccessful to achieve their objectives. In the East, he earned his reputation as an effective commander within the military circles whose efforts had partially made the strategic shores of East Pakistan safe from the Indian Navy.

Liberation war and surrender

The Indian Air Force's aerial campaign resulted in taking Sq. Ldr PQ Mehdi as war prisoner and dismantling the only No. 14 Squadron active in the East. Admiral Shariff authorized Lieutenant-Colonel Liaquat Asrar Bukhari to evacuate the Aviation Corps and take refuge to neighbouring Burma. When Air Commodore Inamul Haq, commander of Eastern Air Command, argued against the evacuation, Shariff strongly lobbied for the evacuation by convincing Lieutenant-General Niazi that Colonel Liaqat Bukhari should be allowed to give it a try, as several helicopters would be prevented from falling into enemy hands. General Niazi agreed with Rear-Admiral Shariff and ordered Colonel Liaqat to launch an evacuation operation immediately. Over several nights, the army aviators, large number of PAF pilots and personnel successfully left for Akyab in Burma.

About the deployment of US Taskforce 74 in support to the Pakistani military, Admiral Shariff had notified General Niazi that "if the American Fleet had been coming to help them [Eastern Command], it would have established contacts with his HQ."

During the entire military conflict, insurgency was widely spread to entire provincial state, the East-Pakistan. The Indian Military had intervened in East-Pakistan, the Eastern Air Command and Eastern Military Command forced Lieutenant-General A. A. K. Niazi to surrender the Pakistan Eastern Command Forces to his counterpart Jagjit Singh Arora. In spite of Eastern Naval Command paying a heavy price, Admiral Shariff continued to keep the morale of Pakistan Navy personnel on high who were later pushed back to the wall by Mukti Bahni and the animosity of public that pounded the Pakistan Naval assets.

As Indian Armed Forces entered in East-Pakistan, Shariff planned an immediate evacuation operation.  He commanded and oversaw the maximum evacuation of Pakistan Naval assets from East Pakistan to Burma in a limited time.  However, the night Pakistan Eastern Military High Command were surrendered, Shariff with a small number of military officers planned to leave as the Pakistan naval vessel was waiting for their evacuation.  As the East-Pakistan fell, all the naval routes were closed by Indian Navy, forcing Shariff to remain in East-Pakistan.

On 16 December, Rear-Admiral Mohammad Shariff surrendered his TT pistol to Vice-Admiral Nilakanta Krishnan, the Flag Officer Commanding-in-Chief Eastern Naval Command at 4:31pm (16:31hrs).  His TT Pistol is still placed in "covered glass" display at the Indian Military Academy's Museum.

Later, he joined General Niazi where he was presented at the time when the Instrument of Surrender was signed. Shariff was the only Admiral at that particular event, with thirty brigadiers, and four Major-Generals, and thousands of soldiers and personnel witnessed the event and instrument that Niazi signed.

War prisoner and return

Upon surrendering of the Eastern Command, Rear-Admiral Shariff was taken as prisoner of war (POW) and was taken adjacent Camp No. 77A, where many of the senior military officials were held, including Lieutenant-General Niazi, in 1971. In 1972, he was later shifted to Fort William in Calcutta where the U.S. Navy naval chief Admiral Elmo Zumwalt paid him a visit, followed by a visit of Indian naval chief Admiral S.M. Nanda.

Later, Admiral Nanda transferred him to Jabalpur, to Rear-Admiral Gautum Singh who had done communications operations and specialization under Admiral Shariff in HMS Mercury during World War II. He also requested a copy of the Quran which he recited during his time of his imprisonment.

In March 1973, the Indian government handed over Rear-Admiral Shariff to Pakistan government at the Wagha border. He was allowed to resume his military service and testified in the War Enquiry Commission, where he noted that: "the foundation for the defeat in East Pakistan could be traced back to the military coup d'état in 1958 where senior officers became greedy self-serving politicians rather than soldiers." In 1974, he was promoted as Vice-Admiral and appointed as Vice-Chief of Naval Staff under Vice-Admiral H.H. Ahmed despite the latter being junior to Vice-Admiral Shariff.

Chief of Naval Staff

On 23 March 1975, Vice-Admiral Shariff's appointment as Chief of Naval Staff was approved by Prime Minister Zulfikar Ali Bhutto after Vice-Admiral Hasan Hafeez Ahmed died of heart complications on 8 March 1975. At the time of his appointment, he was the most senior admiral and superseded no one. In 1976, Vice-Admiral Shariff was promoted to four-star rank Admiral by President Fazal Ilahi Chaudhry— the first four-star appointment in the history of the Navy since its establishment in 1947.

Chairman Joint Chiefs of Staff

On 22 January 1977, he was appointed acting Chairman Joint Chiefs of Staff Committee in the absence of General Muhammad Shariff and led the delegation to meet with Vice Chairman Li Xiannian when he paid a state visit to Pakistan.

In 1977, Admiral Shariff supported the martial law enforced by Chief of Army Staff General Zia-ul-Haq after the popular civil unrest sparked after the general elections held in 1977. He was named deputy CMLA in the Military Council that is viewed to assist President Fazal Ilahi.

In 1977, he was appointed acting Chairman Joint Chiefs of Staff Committee in the absence of General Muhammad Shariff who later resigned amid disagreement of the decision of the martial law on 22 January 1977. To sustain the presidency, the military staff appointments in the Navy and the Air Force were highly important for President Zia-ul-Haq to keep the inter-services loyal to General Zia-ul-Haq. In 1978, his appointment to the chairman joint chiefs was officially confirmed by President Ilahi after the involuntary resignation of General Muhammad Sharif. He was the second Chairman joint chiefs and the first admiral to have been appointed chairman joint chiefs.

With Admiral Shariff appointed as Chairman joint chiefs, he invited Admiral Karamat Rahman Niazi to be appointed as Chief of Naval Staff in his capacity who was also promoted to the four-star rank. His experience as Deputy MLA in East Pakistan highly benefitted General Zia-ul-Haq to consolidate and stabilize the presidency of President Zia-ul-Haq in 1978.

Soviet–Afghan War
On 25 December 1979, the Soviet Union officially intervened in Afghanistan and President Zia called for a national security meeting that was attended by the Chairman joint chiefs, chiefs of staff of army, navy, and air force. At this meeting, he made no intentions against Soviet involvement in East Pakistan's crises after witnessing the Soviet support to India and Mukti Bahini. After this meeting, Zia authorized this operation under General Rahman, and it was later merged with Operation Cyclone, a programme funded by the United States and the CIA.

At this meeting, President Zia had asked Admiral Shariff and his army chief of staff General Khalid Mahmud Arif to lead a geo-strategic civil-military team to formulate a geostrategy to counter Soviet aggression. He played a crucial role in President Zia's policy on nuclear weapons and was a strong proponent for the implementation of the nuclear deterrent with a view to prevention of foreign intervention. He advised an aggressive policy towards supporting the Afghan mujahideen and supporting a covert but aggressive nuclear option to prevent the military infiltration from India and the Soviet Union.

Later life and post-retirement
In 1980, Admiral Shariff's retirement was due and decided not to seek an extension as he was succeeded by General Iqbal Khan. He was given a guard of honour, and a monument under his name was built in Navy NHQ and the Joint Staff HQ.

Upon retirement, he was appointed as Chairman of the Federal Public Service Commission and continued his role as military adviser to President Zia. However, he was given criticism for leading the appointment of those civil bureaucrats who were loyal to his government and his chairmanship, while those who were not were subsequently moved. He continued his role as military adviser and the chairmanship until the death of President Zia-ul-Haq in 1988 and took retirement from public service and his role as the military adviser to the Government of Pakistan.

Admiral Shariff was a recipient of Hilal-i-Jurat, which was awarded to him after the 1971 war and the Nishan-e-Imtiaz by Bhutto after coming back from India.

After his retirement, he lived a quiet life in Islamabad surrounded and supported by close friends and family, and served as President of Elaf Club of Pakistan, a political and military think tank based in Islamabad.

On 23 September 2010, Admiral Shariff wrote and launched his first autobiography Admiral's Diary, in English. The ceremony was held at the Bahria University Auditorium. Chief of Naval Staff Admiral Noman Bashir was chief guest on the occasion. The book launching was attended by seasoned retired military officers and serving bureaucrats, senior retired and serving officers of the three services, family members and friends of the author, notable literary personalities, press and media.

Shariff died on 27 April 2020.

Awards and decorations

Foreign Decorations

References

External links
 Official website of Pakistan Navy
 Admiral Mohammad Shariff 23 March 1975 21 March 1979
 

|-

Admirals of the Indo-Pakistani War of 1971
Chairmen Joint Chiefs of Staff Committee
Chiefs of Naval Staff (Pakistan)
Foreign recipients of the Legion of Merit
Indian military personnel of World War II
Military government of Pakistan (1977–1988)
Pakistan Navy admirals
Pakistani cryptographers
Pakistani memoirists
Pakistani prisoners of war
Pakistani writers
People of the Bangladesh Liberation War
People of the Soviet–Afghan War
Recipients of Hilal-i-Imtiaz
Recipients of Hilal-i-Jur'at
Recipients of Nishan-e-Imtiaz
Recipients of Sitara-i-Imtiaz
Royal Indian Navy officers
Graduates of Britannia Royal Naval College
Naval War College alumni
Rashtriya Indian Military College alumni
Telegraphists
People from Gujrat District
People from Islamabad
Punjabi people
1920 births
2020 deaths
Pakistani people of Kashmiri descent